The 2000 Buffalo Bulls football team represented the University at Buffalo in the 2000 NCAA Division I-A football season. The Bulls offense scored 177 points while the defense allowed 452 points.

Schedule

Roster

References

Buffalo
Buffalo Bulls football seasons
Buffalo Bulls football